Mona Ann-Charlotte Olin (born 1967) is a Swedish politician affiliated with the Sweden Democrats.

Olin was a director for an IT company before becoming a politician. She has served as a municipal councilor and a board member for the SD in Hörby municipality where she campaigned to open a family resource centre. She was elected as Member of the Riksdag in September 2022. She represents the constituency of Kalmar County. Since her election to parliament she has served on the social insurance committee in the Riksdag.

References 

Living people
1967 births
Place of birth missing (living people)
21st-century Swedish politicians
21st-century Swedish women politicians
Members of the Riksdag 2022–2026
Members of the Riksdag from the Sweden Democrats
Women members of the Riksdag